Claude Independent School District is a public school district based in Claude, Texas (USA).

In 2009, the school district was rated "recognized" by the Texas Education Agency.

Schools
In the 2012-2013 school year, the district had students in two schools. 
Claude High School (Grades 6-12)
Claude Elementary (Grades PK-5) (2005 National Blue Ribbon School).

The Claude Lady Mustangs won the 1951 Class B girl's state basketball championship, the first Class B title recognized by the UIL.  The Lady Mustangs would go on to win the next two titles as well (1952 and 1953) and again in 1962.

References

External links 
Claude ISD

School districts in Armstrong County, Texas